Robin Pilcher (born 10 August 1950) is a British author, the eldest son of author Rosamunde Pilcher. His books have been translated into more than a dozen languages.

Bibliography 
 An Ocean Apart, 1999, 
 Starting Over, 2002, 
 A Risk Worth Taking, 2004, 
 Starburst, 2007, 
 The Long Way Home, 2010,

Television adaptations 
 An Ocean Apart (2006)
 Starting Over (2007)
 A Risk Worth Taking (2008)

References

External links 
 

1950 births
Living people
People educated at Clifton College
20th-century British novelists
Place of birth missing (living people)
21st-century British novelists